Comminution is the reduction of solid materials from one average particle size to a smaller average particle size, by crushing, grinding, cutting, vibrating, or other processes. In geology, it occurs naturally during faulting in the upper part of the Earth's crust. In industry, it is an important unit operation in mineral processing, ceramics, electronics, and other fields, accomplished with many types of mill. In dentistry, it is the result of mastication of food. In general medicine, it is one of the most traumatic forms of bone fracture.

Within industrial uses, the purpose of comminution is to reduce the size and to increase the surface area of solids. It is also used to free useful materials from matrix materials in which they are embedded, and to concentrate minerals.

Energy requirements 
The comminution of solid materials consumes energy, which is being used to break up the solid into smaller pieces. The comminution energy can be estimated by:

Rittinger's law, which assumes that the energy consumed is proportional to the newly generated surface area;
Kick's law, which related the energy to the sizes of the feed particles and the product particles;
Bond's law, which assumes that the total work useful in breakage is inversely proportional to the square root of the diameter of the product particles, [implying] theoretically that the work input varies as the length of the new cracks made in breakage.
Holmes's law, which modifies Bond's law by substituting the square root with an exponent that depends on the material.

Forces 
There are three forces which typically are used to effect the comminution of particles: impact, shear, and compression.

Methods 
There are several methods of comminution. Comminution of solid materials requires different types of crushers and mills depending on the feed properties such as hardness at various size ranges and application requirements such as throughput and maintenance. The most common machines for the comminution of coarse feed material (primary crushers) are the jaw crusher (1m > P80 > 100 mm), cone crusher (P80 > 20 mm) and hammer crusher. Primary crusher product in intermediate feed particle size ranges (100mm > P80 > 20mm) can be ground in autogenous (AG) or semi-autogenous (SAG) mills depending on feed properties and application requirements. For comminution of finer particle size ranges  (20mm > P80 > 30 μm) machines like the ball mill, vertical roller mill, hammer mill, roller press or high compression roller mill, vibration mill, jet mill and others are used. For yet finer grind sizes (sometimes referred to as "ultrafine grinding"), specialist mills such as the IsaMill are used.

Trituration, for instance, is comminution (or substance breakdown) by rubbing. Trituration can further be described as levigation (trituration of a powder with a non-solvent liquid), or pulverization by intervention, which is trituration with a solvent that can be easily removed after the substance has been broken down.

See also

References 

 
Industrial processes